Hollywood Pictures was an American film production label of Walt Disney Studios, founded and owned by The Walt Disney Company. Established on February 1, 1989, by then-Disney CEO Michael Eisner and then-studio chief Jeffrey Katzenberg, Hollywood Pictures was founded to increase the film output of the Walt Disney Studios, and release films similar to those of Touchstone Pictures, that featured mature themes targeted to adult audiences than those produced by the studio's flagship Walt Disney Pictures division. After years of hiatus, the label was shuttered on April 27, 2007.

Hollywood Pictures' most commercially successful film was M. Night Shyamalan's The Sixth Sense, which grossed over $670 million worldwide upon its 1999 release.

History 
Hollywood Pictures Corporation was incorporated on March 30, 1984 and was activated on February 1, 1989. Ricardo Mestres was appointed the division's first president, moving from Disney's Touchstone Pictures. The division was formed to create opportunities for up-and-coming executives and to double Disney's feature-film output in order to fill the gap left by the contraction in the industry, which included closure of MGM/UA's United Artists and financial problems at Lorimar-Telepictures and De Laurentiis Entertainment Group. With Touchstone aligned with Hollywood, the two Disney  production divisions would share the same marketing and distribution staffs. Hollywood was expected to be producing 12 films a year by 1991 and to share funding from the Silver Screen Partners IV. The company's first release was Arachnophobia on July 18, 1990.

On October 23, 1990, The Walt Disney Company formed Touchwood Pacific Partners to supplant the Silver Screen Partnership series as their movie studios' primary funding source.

After the collapse of their then-recently renewed deal at Paramount Pictures, Don Simpson and Jerry Bruckheimer moved their production company to Hollywood Pictures on January 18, 1991.

The division issued primarily inexpensive comedies for the first six years with a few box office flops, amongst them Holy Matrimony, Aspen Extreme, Super Mario Bros., Swing Kids, Blame It on the Bellboy, Born Yesterday and Guilty as Sin. The division only had one box office success, The Hand That Rocks the Cradle, and one critical success, The Joy Luck Club, which did not outweigh the general anemic box office record of the division. On April 26, 1994, Mestres was forced to resign after the lackluster performance of the division. Mestres moved to long term production deal with the studio.

On June 27, 1994, Michael Lynton was appointed as new division president after moving from the Disney Publishing Group, where he was senior vice president and oversaw domestic publishing units including Hyperion Books. Mestres left Lynton a few potential hits: Robert Redford's Quiz Show, the Sarah Jessica Parker-Antonio Banderas drama Miami Rhapsody, and Dangerous Minds, starring Michelle Pfeiffer. In 1997, Lynton left for a position at Penguin Group. By 2001, Hollywood Pictures had produced 80 films, but its operation had been phased out and its management was merged with that of the flagship Walt Disney Pictures studio.

After being dormant for five years, the brand was reactivated for low-budget genre films. Films released by the repurposed Hollywood Pictures were three horror films: Stay Alive (released on March 24, 2006), Primeval (released on January 12, 2007), and The Invisible (released on April 27, 2007). After the latter release, Disney stopped producing and distributing under the label as it announced a focus on the company's core brands of Disney, Touchstone, ABC, ESPN, and Pixar.

Filmography

See also 
 List of Walt Disney Pictures films
 List of Touchstone Pictures films
 List of 20th Century Studios films
 List of Searchlight Pictures films

References 

1989 establishments in California
2007 disestablishments in California
American companies established in 1989
American companies disestablished in 2007
Companies based in Burbank, California
Disney production studios
Defunct brands
Defunct American film studios
Defunct companies based in Greater Los Angeles
Entertainment companies based in California
Film production companies of the United States
Mass media companies established in 1989
Mass media companies disestablished in 2007
Re-established companies
Walt Disney Studios (division)
The Walt Disney Company subsidiaries
Michael Eisner
Jeffrey Katzenberg